The Nortonia Boarding House, at 150 Ridge St. in Reno, Nevada, was built in c.1900-1904.  In 1906 it was purchased by Norton, who changed it to a boarding house, and it was also extended then. It is primarily Queen Anne in style but includes elements of Colonial Revival architecture as well.  It was listed on the National Register of Historic Places in 1983.  It is notable as "one of the best" surviving Queen Anne houses in Reno.

References 

Residential buildings on the National Register of Historic Places in Nevada
Queen Anne architecture in Nevada
Colonial Revival architecture in Nevada
Houses completed in 1900
National Register of Historic Places in Reno, Nevada
Hotels in Nevada